Harold Chapman (1927–2022) was a British photographer noted for chronicling the 1950s in Paris.

Harold Chapman may also refer to:

Harold Chapman (orthodontist) (1881–1965), England's first exclusive Orthodontic practitioner 
Harold Chapman (cricketer) (1922–2007), New Zealand cricketer
Harold Chapman (rugby league), rugby league footballer of the 1920s and 1930s who played for Castleford
Harold Chapman (footballer), association footballer who played for New Zealand